Dipahdih is an archaeological place of Balrampur district, Chhattisgarh, India. It is about 75 km from Ambikapur, headquarters of Surguja. It contains the remnants of the Shaiv and Shakya sects.

References
 

Balrampur district, Chhattisgarh
Archaeology of India